The 1996 Estonian Figure Skating Championships were held in Tallinn from February 10 to 11, 1996. Skaters competed in the disciplines of men's singles, ladies' singles, pair skating, and ice dancing on the senior and junior levels.

Senior results

Men
4 participants

Ladies
4 participants

Pairs

Ice dancing

Junior results
The 1997 Estonian Junior Figure Skating Championships took place in Tallinn from March 16 through 17, 1997.

Men

Ladies
6 participants

Ice dancing
6 participants

References

Figure Skating Championships
Estonian Figure Skating Championships, 1996
Estonian Figure Skating Championships